Scooter Ward (born Ronald Ward Jr. on May 7, 1970) is an American musician who is best known as a founding member and lead singer of the rock band Cold. He has also performed occasional guitar duties both in the studio and live. Ward has been ranked in the Top 100 Heavy Metal Vocalists by Hit Parader (number 61).

Career

Grundig 
In 1986, Ward formed the band Grundig along with several other students; Sam McCandless, Jeremy Marshall, and Matt Loughran at Fletcher High School in Neptune Beach, Florida. The band played their first gig in 1990 at a club called the Spray. In 1992, the band released an eight-song EP called "Into Everything" and moved to Atlanta, Georgia. Three and a half years later in 1995, Grundig broke up and Ward moved back to Jacksonville, where he, McCandless, Kelly Hayes, and Pat Lally formed the band Diablo. Diablo would only last about three months.

Cold 
At the end of that three-month period, Grundig reformed under the name Cold and signed a six-album record deal with A&M Records. Ward would remain in Cold until February 2006 when, after several lineup changes and battles with record labels, the band decided to break up. Scooter Ward and McCandless promptly began working on their new project, The Witch, which McCandless has since left. The project has been renamed twice, When November Falls and now The Killer and the Star. The debut album was released in July 2009. In early 2009, Cold reformed for a reunion tour. Their album Superfiction was released on July 19, 2011. Their latest album, The Things We Can't Stop, was released on September 13, 2019, after Cold went through some line up changes.

Personal life 
Ward is married and has two daughters, Raven and Cameron (as mentioned in the liner notes for Cold's fourth album, A Different Kind of Pain). He was previously engaged, but his fiancé broke it off in 2004 just as Ward was dealing with his sister's bout with cancer. During this time, Ward was dealing with alcoholism and drug addiction and entered himself into rehabilitation. While in rehab, Ward, who was raised Southern Baptist, found relief through spirituality and embraced Christianity.

Ward has been a serious Spider-Man and Marvel Comics fan since childhood and has collected Spider-Man merchandise. He wrote the song "What Happens Now" with the hopes that it would be featured in the 2012 film, The Amazing Spider-Man; the track is accompanied by artwork of a Spider-Man-inspired character in the album's booklet.

Instruments 

Scooter Ward played both guitar and piano in Grundig and on Cold's debut album, but stopped playing guitar when the band recruited Terry Balsamo, only to pick it up again during the recording of Superfiction nearly ten years later. Ward usually uses Gibson SG guitars with DR DDT strings and Vox amplification.

Discography

Guest vocals 
In addition to his releases with Cold and Grundig, Ward has also been a guest vocalist on the songs:

Tony Iommi – "Something Wicked This Way Comes"
Reveille – "Inside Out (Can You Feel Me Now)"
Superfly Rodeo – "Reach"
Sierra Swan – "You Got Away"
Professor Hoetester – "The Saddest Song"
He-Nis-Ra – "Derailed" (2015)
Breaking Benjamin – "Far Away"

References

External links 
Facebook: Cold Official

1970 births
Living people
American heavy metal singers
American male singer-songwriters
American rock songwriters
Musicians from Jacksonville, Florida
Singer-songwriters from Florida
Alternative metal musicians
21st-century American singers
21st-century American male singers
Nu metal singers